Pierre Collin (born July 18, 1938) is a Canadian actor from Quebec. He is most noted for his performance in the 2003 film Seducing Doctor Lewis (La Grande Séduction), for which he won the Jutra Award for Best Supporting Actor at the 6th Jutra Awards in 2004.

Collin began his career in the 1960s with the avant garde theatre troupe Les Apprentis-Sorciers.

Filmography

Film

Television

References

External links

1938 births
20th-century Canadian male actors
21st-century Canadian male actors
Canadian male film actors
Canadian male television actors
Canadian male stage actors
Canadian theatre directors
Male actors from Montreal
French Quebecers
Living people
Best Supporting Actor Jutra and Iris Award winners